Hesperomannia arbuscula, the Maui island-aster or Maui hesperomannia, is a species of flowering plant in the family Asteraceae that is endemic to the islands of Oahu and Maui in Hawaii. It is threatened by habitat loss.

There are fewer than 60 plants remaining in the wild.

References

Arbuscula
Endemic flora of Hawaii
Biota of Maui
Taxonomy articles created by Polbot